Nandi Yellaiah (1 July 1942 – 8 August 2020) was an Indian politician from Indian National Congress party who served as a member of the Parliament of India from Nagarkurnool constituency of Telangana state in the Lok Sabha, the lower house of the Indian Parliament.

Early life
He was born in Tajir Nagar, Bholakpur, Musheerabad, in Hyderabad State to Nandi Nagaiah. He finished his matriculation.

Career
He was a six-term member of Lok Sabha. He was elected to 6th, 7th, 9th, 10th, 11th Lok Sabha from Siddipet (s.c) parliamentary constituency. He was elected to the 16th Lok Sabha from Nagarkurnool defeating Manda Jagannatham. He also represented Rajya Sabha until 2014.

Death 
He died on 8 August 2020, aged 78, from COVID-19 during the COVID-19 pandemic in India.

References

External links
 Profile on Rajya Sabha website 

|-

|-

Indian National Congress politicians
2020 deaths
1942 births
People from Hyderabad district, India
Rajya Sabha members from Andhra Pradesh
India MPs 2014–2019
Lok Sabha members from Telangana
India MPs 1977–1979
India MPs 1980–1984
India MPs 1989–1991
India MPs 1991–1996
India MPs 1996–1997
People from Nagarkurnool district
Deaths from the COVID-19 pandemic in India
Indian National Congress politicians from Andhra Pradesh